Racing Louisville FC is an American soccer club which began play in the National Women's Soccer League in 2021.

All rostered players during the NWSL season, including the playoffs and Challenge Cup, are included, even if they did not make an appearance.

All-time roster and appearances 
Statistics are correct , and are updated once a year after the conclusion of the NWSL season. Players whose names are in boldface text were active players on Racing Louisville FC's roster as of the list's most recent update.

See also 

 List of top-division football clubs in CONCACAF countries
 List of professional sports teams in the United States and Canada

External links 
 Racing Louisville Roster Details on FBref.com
 Stats on nwslsoccer.com

Lists of soccer players by club in the United States
 
Kentucky sports-related lists
Lists of women's association football players
Lists of American sportswomen
National Women's Soccer League lists
Association football player non-biographical articles